John Roland Kinzer (March 28, 1874 – July 25, 1955) was a Republican member of the U.S. House of Representatives from Pennsylvania.

Biography
J. Roland Kinzer was born on a farm near Terre Hill, Pennsylvania in East Earl Township, Lancaster County, Pennsylvania  He graduated from Franklin & Marshall College in  Lancaster, Pennsylvania, in 1896. He served as county solicitor of Lancaster County from 1912–1923, and as a delegate to the 1928 Republican National Convention.  He was elected as a Republican to the seventy-first Congress to fill the vacancy caused by the death of William W. Griest.  He was reelected to the seventy-second Congress and to the seven succeeding Congresses.  He was not a candidate for renomination in 1946.

Sources

External links

1874 births
1955 deaths
American Lutherans
Politicians from Lancaster, Pennsylvania
Franklin & Marshall College alumni
Republican Party members of the United States House of Representatives from Pennsylvania
20th-century American politicians
Burials at Woodward Hill Cemetery